The 2019–20 season is the Tractor Sport Club's 12th season in the Pro League, and their 11th consecutive season in the top division of Iranian Football. They will also be competing in the Hazfi Cup.

Players

First team squad
As of 11 September 2019.

Transfers

In

Out

Coaching staff

Competitions

Overview

Persian Gulf Pro League

Standings

Results summary

Results by round

Matches

Hazfi Cup

References

Tractor S.C. seasons
Tractor Sazi